José Joaquín Antonio Trejos Fernández (18 April 1916 10 February 2010) was 35th President of Costa Rica from 1966 to 1970.
His parents were Juan Trejos Quirós and Emilia Fernández Aguilar. As a student he obtained degrees in mathematics and economics from the University of Costa Rica. During Mario Echandi's administration he was part of Costa Rica's delegation in the United Nations.
Trejos defeated Daniel Oduber in the election that secured him the presidency.
Trejos died on 10 February 2010. In the months before his death he began to have problems, when he had an accident in December 2009.

Elected as president 
Without any political experience he won the presidential election of 1966 as candidate of a "Unificación Nacional" coalition. His victory was a close win over Daniel Oduber Quirós, with less than 4000 votes in his favor. Voters elected 26 congressmen from his party and the opposition won 29 seats. 
During the Trejos presidency, the aggregated tax (IV) was introduced and the government debts were virtually erased.

References 

1916 births
2010 deaths
People from San José, Costa Rica
Presidents of Costa Rica
University of Costa Rica alumni
National Unification Party (Costa Rica) politicians
Costa Rican liberals